Peter Paul Fernandes M.B.E (15 September 1916 – 24 January 1981) was an Indian Field Hockey player who competed at the 1936 Summer Olympics in Berlin, Germany.  His selection made him the first Goan to represent India in hockey at the Olympics. He attended Saint Patrick's High School, Karachi. He also played in nine first-class cricket matches.

Playing career
He played with the Karachi Goan Association team. His playing position was forward.

References

External links
 Goal Dhyan Chan autobiography Retrieved 17 September 2010.
 
 
 
 Peter Paul Fernandes' biography at Sports Reference.com
 Cricket Archive
 Cricinfo

1916 births
1981 deaths
Field hockey players from Goa
Olympic field hockey players of India
Field hockey players at the 1936 Summer Olympics
Indian male field hockey players
Olympic gold medalists for India
Pakistani male field hockey players
Pakistani people of Goan descent
Pakistani Roman Catholics
Indian cricketers
Pakistani cricketers
Cricketers from Karachi
Sindh cricketers
St. Patrick's High School, Karachi alumni
Field hockey players from Karachi
Medalists at the 1936 Summer Olympics
Members of the Order of the British Empire
Olympic medalists in field hockey